Johannes Hendrikus Hengeveld (December 24, 1894 – May 4, 1961) was a Dutch tug of war competitor, who competed in the 1920 Summer Olympics. He was born in Arnhem and died in Arnhem.

In 1920 Hengeveld won the silver medal as member of the Dutch tug of war team.

References

External links
profile

1894 births
1961 deaths
Olympic tug of war competitors of the Netherlands
Tug of war competitors at the 1920 Summer Olympics
Olympic silver medalists for the Netherlands
Sportspeople from Arnhem
Olympic medalists in tug of war
Medalists at the 1920 Summer Olympics